The 2002 AFF U-20 Youth Championship was the inaugural edition of the tournament.  It took place from 23 January to 3 February 2002 and was co-hosted by Thailand and Cambodia with all ten member nations of the ASEAN Football Federation taking part.

Teams

Tournament 
All times are Indochina Time (ICT) - UTC+7

Group stage

Group A 
All matches in Bangkok, Thailand

Group B 
All matches in Phnom Penh, Cambodia

Knockout stage 
All matches in Bangkok, Thailand

Bracket

Semi-finals

Third place play-off

Final

Winner

Notes

References 
Stokkermans, Karel. "ASEAN U-20 Championship 2002" RSSSF.
"Tournaments 2002" ThaiFootball.com.

U-20 Youth Championship, 2002
Aff U-20 Youth Championship, 2002
2002
2002
2002 in youth association football